La Ronge (Barber Field) Airport  is located  northeast of La Ronge, Saskatchewan, Canada.

See also 
List of airports in Saskatchewan
La Ronge Water Aerodrome
La Ronge Heliport

References

External links

Certified airports in Saskatchewan